Tico-Tico no Fubá is a 1952 Brazilian drama film directed by Adolfo Celi and starring Anselmo Duarte. It was entered into the 1952 Cannes Film Festival.

The film is a fictionalized biography of Brazilian composer Zequinha de Abreu (1880–1935), who penned the song "Tico-Tico no Fubá" that became an international hit in the 1940s.

Cast
Anselmo Duarte as Zequinha de Abreu
Tônia Carrero as Branca
Marisa Prado as  Durvalina
Marina Freire as Amália
Zbigniew Ziembinski as  Circus Master
Modesto De Souza as  Luís
Haydée Moraes Aguiar
Luiz Augusto Arantes
Tito Livio Baccarin
Lima Barreto as  Inácio
Xandó Batista as  Vendedor de rádio

References

External links
 

1952 films
1950s Portuguese-language films
Columbia Pictures films
Brazilian black-and-white films
Brazilian biographical drama films
1950s biographical drama films
Films directed by Adolfo Celi
1952 drama films